The Christian Front (CF) was a conservative Christian political party in South Africa, a breakaway from the Christian Democratic Party.

The leader of the CF was Rudi Du Plooy. Aside from operating as a political party, it also ran a Special Social Committee, mandated to look after the elderly and destitute.

The CF was deregistered by the IEC before the 2014 general election.

References

External links
 Christian Front

Defunct political parties in South Africa
Political parties disestablished in 2014
Defunct Christian political parties
Conservative parties in South Africa